Raja Raveendra Wimalasiri (born 19 August 1969) is a Sri Lankan cricketer and umpire. He stood in his first One Day International (ODI) on 23 July 2013, between Sri Lanka and South Africa. He stood in his first Twenty20 International (T20I) on 2 August 2013, also between Sri Lanka and South Africa.

In October 2019, he was appointed as one of the twelve umpires to officiate matches in the 2019 ICC T20 World Cup Qualifier tournament in the United Arab Emirates. In January 2020, he was named as one of the sixteen umpires for the 2020 Under-19 Cricket World Cup tournament in South Africa.

See also
 List of One Day International cricket umpires
 List of Twenty20 International cricket umpires

References

External links
 

1969 births
Living people
Sri Lankan One Day International cricket umpires
Sri Lankan Twenty20 International cricket umpires
Sportspeople from Colombo
Sri Lankan cricketers
Sri Lanka Police Sports Club cricketers
Ruhuna cricketers